Adelelm, Abbot of Abingdon.

Adelelm was a Norman monk at Jumièges appointed Abbot of Abingdon in 1071; he was part of an embassy from King William to King Malcolm and died in 1083 (Kelly 2000).

References
Kelly, S. E. 2000. Charters of Abingdon, part 1. Anglo-Saxon Charters 7.

Abbots of Abingdon
1083 deaths
Year of birth unknown
Date of death unknown